Tatiana Skotnikova is a former Russian football midfielder, who played for CSKA Moscow in the Russian Championship.

She was the captain of the Russian national team, and served as such in the 2009 European Championship.

References

1978 births
Living people
Russian women's footballers
Russia women's international footballers
1999 FIFA Women's World Cup players
2003 FIFA Women's World Cup players
FIFA Century Club
FC Energy Voronezh players
WFC Rossiyanka players
Zvezda 2005 Perm players
Women's association football midfielders
FC Lada Togliatti (women) players
FC Zorky Krasnogorsk (women) players
ZFK CSKA Moscow players
Russian Women's Football Championship players